Luciano Comaschi (3 July 1931 – 30 April 2019) was an Italian professional footballer who played for Brescia and Napoli. He also played for Italy at youth international level.

References

1931 births
2019 deaths
Italian footballers
Brescia Calcio players
S.S.C. Napoli players
Serie B players
Serie A players
Association football fullbacks
Italy youth international footballers